Guran may refer to:
 Gurans Rural Municipality, in Nepal
 Guran Kurds, an ethnic group

See also 
 Guran (disambiguation)
 Goran (disambiguation)